Mount Butters is the snowcapped summit,  high, of a buttress-type escarpment at the extreme southeast end of Anderson Heights, between Mincey Glacier on the south and Shackleton Glacier on the east. It was discovered and photographed by U.S. Navy Operation Highjump (1946–47) on the flights of February 16, 1947, and named by the Advisory Committee on Antarctic Names for Captain Raymond J. Butters, United States Marine Corps, navigator of Flight 8A.

See also
Mount Greenlee

References
 

Landforms of the Ross Dependency
Escarpments of Antarctica
Dufek Coast